Dominic Robert Andrew Johnson, Baron Johnson of Lainston  (born 6 April 1974) is a British financier, hedge fund manager and politician, the co-founder and chief executive officer (CEO) of Somerset Capital Management. He currently serves as a Minister of State in the Department for International Trade, having served in the department during the tenure of Liz Truss. Johnson has given more than £250,000 to the Conservative Party, and was its vice-chairman from 2016 to 2019.

Early life
Johnson was born in London in 1974, son of Patrick Johnson and Juliet Elizabeth, daughter of Lt Andrew John Craig-Harvey, 5th Royal Inniskilling Dragoon Guards, of Lainston House, Sparsholt, near Winchester, Hampshire, now a hotel. Juliet's mother, Mary, daughter of Royal Navy Captain Robert Bradshaw Wilmot Sitwell, CBE, was a descendant, through her mother, of the Conservative politicians Charles Cocks, 1st Baron Somers and Sir Armine Wodehouse, 5th Baronet. Johnson's maternal uncle, Nicholas Craig-Harvey, is married to Lady Julia, daughter of the Conservative politician Hugh Percy, 10th Duke of Northumberland and maternal granddaughter of Walter Montagu Douglas Scott, 8th Duke of Buccleuch, also a Conservative politician.

When Johnson was six months old, his mother fatally stabbed his father after an argument over a burnt meal; although two guests attempted to assist him, Patrick Johnson died two days later aged thirty one. Johnson's mother, aged twenty seven, was found guilty of manslaughter on grounds of diminished responsibility, and sent to Rooksdown Hospital in Hampshire; she was subsequently released and later remarried. Johnson and his older sister were raised by their maternal grandparents.

Johnson earned a bachelor's degree in politics from Durham University, graduating in 1995.

Career
Johnson began his career in finance with Robert Fleming & Co. in 1995, and then with Jardine Fleming, Hong Kong, in 1998. In 2001, he went into asset management, and worked for Lloyd George Management until 2007. In 2007, he co-founded Somerset Capital Management (SCM) with Jacob Rees-Mogg and Edward Robertson. All three were colleagues at Lloyd George Management in Hong Kong. Rees-Mogg was CEO of SCM until Johnson succeeded him in 2010.

In September 2022, SCM with assets under management of about $5 billion was up for sale, with Johnson planning to move into politics, and would be succeeded by chief operating officer Robert Diggle as CEO.

Politics
From 2006 to 2010, Johnson was a Conservative councillor for the Royal Borough of Kensington and Chelsea.

In 2016, when his friend David Cameron stood down as prime minister, Johnson gave him the use of his £2,650-a-week Chelsea house, and Cameron accordingly declared a benefit of more than £37,000 in the register of MPs' interests.

Johnson has given more than £250,000 to the Conservative Party, and was its vice-chairman from 2016 to 2019. In the 2017 New Year Honours, Johnson was appointed a Commander of the Order of the British Empire (CBE) "for political service".

On 2 October 2022, Johnson was appointed by Liz Truss as a minister of state in the Cabinet Office and the Department for International Trade. On 19 October 2022, to facilitate his ministerial role, he was created Baron Johnson of Lainston, of Lainston in the County of Hampshire. "Lainston" derives from his mother's family home, Lainston House, near Winchester in Hampshire, which is now a hotel. Johnson was sacked by Truss’s successor, Rishi Sunak, soon after he became Prime Minister.

Sunak re-appointed Johnson as a Minister of State for International Trade on 24 November 2022.

Personal life
In 2006, he married Alice Rose Alethea Hamilton (born 1974), the daughter of Archibald Hamilton, Baron Hamilton of Epsom, a British Conservative Party politician.

References

1974 births
Living people
British financiers
People from London
Conservative Party (UK) donors
British hedge fund managers
JPMorgan Chase employees
Commanders of the Order of the British Empire
Conservative Party (UK) life peers
Life peers created by Charles III
Alumni of Collingwood College, Durham